Bollito misto (literally "mixed boil" or "mixed boiled meat") is a classic northern Italian stew, most closely resembling the French Pot-au-feu, consisting of various tougher cuts of beef and veal, cotechino, and a whole hen or capon that are gently simmered for 2–3 hours in an aromatic vegetable broth. Bollito and its many regional variations is eaten throughout northern Italy, and is particularly popular in Emilia-Romagna, Piedmont, and Lombardy. The meat is sliced thinly and served with coarse sea salt, mostarda, salsa verde, horseradish, or chutney. The resulting broth is skimmed, strained, and used as a base for soups and risottos.

History 
In Italian cuisine, bollito was prominent throughout the second millennium. In the 1800s, crown prince and from 1849 king Vittorio Emanuele II would often sneak off to the small town of Moncalvo to hunt wild game, cavort with his favorite mistress, and enjoy a convivial meal of bollito with friends. Bollito features prominently in various gastronomic texts: Antonio Latini has 38 cooking suggestions for bollito in his cookbook, Lo Scalco alla Moderna (The Modern Steward) (1694); and Maestro Martino has several recipes in his book Libro de Arte Coquinaria (The Art of Cooking), which is considered a landmark of Italian gastronomic literature.

See also 

List of stews

Sources 
https://web.archive.org/web/20120124125543/http://italianfood.about.com/od/boiledbeef/ss/aa041607.htm
https://web.archive.org/web/20120207063921/http://italianfood.about.com/library/weekly/aa011498.htm
http://www.foodnetwork.com/recipes/giada-de-laurentiis/bollito-misto-recipe/index.html
https://web.archive.org/web/20140314204556/http://www.antonio-carluccio.com/Il_Gran_Bollito_Misto

Italian stews